Thomas R. Marshall School, also known as the Town Life Center, is a historic school building located at North Manchester, Wabash County, Indiana.  It was built in 1929, and is a two-story, rectangular, Beaux-Arts style multicolored brick building. It has a projecting center entrance bay with a recessed entrance behind a shallow barrel vault.  The school was named for Indiana Governor and U.S. Vice President Thomas R. Marshall (1854-1925).  It remained in use as an elementary school until 1989, after which it has been used as a community centre.

It was listed on the National Register of Historic Places in 2004.

References

School buildings on the National Register of Historic Places in Indiana
Beaux-Arts architecture in Indiana
School buildings completed in 1929
Buildings and structures in Wabash County, Indiana
National Register of Historic Places in Wabash County, Indiana
1929 establishments in Indiana